Kane Armory, is a historic National Guard "T" Plan armory located in Kane, McKean County, Pennsylvania, United States.  It was designed by Joseph F. Kuntz of Pittsburgh firm W.G. Wilkins Company.  The original two-story drill hall was built in 1922, for the 112th Infantry of the Pennsylvania National Guard.  A two-story administrative section was subsequent added in 1929.

It was listed on the National Register of Historic Places on May 9, 1991.

See also 
 National Register of Historic Places listings in McKean County, Pennsylvania

References 
 

Infrastructure completed in 1922
Armories on the National Register of Historic Places in Pennsylvania
Art Deco architecture in Pennsylvania
Pennsylvania National Guard
Buildings and structures in McKean County, Pennsylvania
National Register of Historic Places in McKean County, Pennsylvania